Rheumatoid neutrophilic dermatitis (also known as "Rheumatoid neutrophilic dermatosis") is a cutaneous condition associated with rheumatoid arthritis.

See also 
 Sweet's syndrome-like dermatosis
 List of cutaneous conditions

References 

Reactive neutrophilic cutaneous conditions